Jinju Citizen FC is a South Korean football club based in the district of Jinju. The team was founded the 23rd of December 2019 and plays in the K4 League, an semi-professional league and the fourth tier of football in South Korea.

Current squad

Season-by-season records

See also
 List of football clubs in South Korea

References

External links
Official website 

Sport in South Gyeongsang Province
Jinju
Association football clubs established in 2019
2019 establishments in South Korea